The Chevron Championship is an annual women's golf competition. It was established in 1972, and became a women's major championship in 1983. It is one of the five women's majors played each year along with the Women's PGA Championship, the U.S. Women's Open, the Women's British Open, and The Evian Championship. The event has been conducted in stroke play competition since its establishment, and is the first women's major championship on the calendar each year. The event has only been staged at Mission Hills Country Club in Rancho Mirage, California.

The champions are presented with the "Dinah Shore Trophy",  in honor of Shore, who promoted the Ladies Professional Golf Association (LPGA). In addition, she helped found the Chevron Championship, previously called the ANA Inspiration, and originally called the Colgate Dinah Shore tournament in her honor.  Past champions are honored with a plaque on the walk-up to the 18th green that is called the "Dinah's Walk of Champions."  Since 1994, champions have taken the plunge into "Poppie's Pond," which is named after the former tournament director Terry Wilcox.  This first occurred in 1988, when Amy Alcott took the plunge, as a spontaneous act of celebration.

Amy Alcott, Betsy King, and Annika Sörenstam hold the record for the most victories with three each. Sörenstam is the only player to win back-to-back titles as a major, winning in both 2001 and 2002.  As a non-major, Sandra Post won back-to-back titles in 1978 and 1979.  The fewest strokes required to complete 72 holes in the tournament's history, and therefore the best winning score, is Dottie Pepper's 269, 19-under-par in 1999. The Chevron Championship has had seven wire-to-wire champions as a major, which are the following: Pat Bradley in 1986, King in 1987, Juli Inkster in 1989, Alcott in 1991, Pat Hurst in 1998, Karrie Webb in 2000, and Patty Tavatanakit in 2021.  The current champion is Jennifer Kupcho.

Champions
Key

Multiple champions
This table lists the golfers who have won more than one ANA Inspiration title. Champions who won in consecutive years are indicated by the years with italics*.
Key

Champions by nationality
This table lists the total number of titles won by golfers of each nationality.
Key

See also
Chronological list of LPGA major golf champions
List of LPGA major championship winning golfers

Notes

 This tournament has had five name changes, which are the following: 1972–1981: Colgate Dinah Shore; 1982–1999: Nabisco Dinah Shore; 2000–2001: Nabisco Championship; 2002–2014: Kraft Nabisco Championship; 2015–2021: ANA Inspiration; 2022–present: Chevron Championship.
 Par is a predetermined number of strokes that a golfer should require to complete a hole, a round (the sum of the total pars of the played holes), or a tournament (the sum of the total pars of each round). E stands for even, which means the tournament was completed in the predetermined number of strokes.
 Jo Ann Prentice won in a sudden death playoff over Jane Blalock and Sandra Haynie.
 Sandra Post won in a sudden death playoff over Penny Pulz.
 Juli Inkster won in a sudden death playoff over Pat Bradley.
 Betsy King won in a sudden death playoff over Patty Sheehan.
 Dottie Mochrie won in a sudden death playoff over Juli Inkster.
 Karrie Webb won in a sudden death playoff over Lorena Ochoa.
 Yoo Sun-young won in a sudden death playoff over In-Kyung Kim.
 Brittany Lincicome won in a sudden death playoff over Stacy Lewis.
 Ryu So-yeon won in a sudden death playoff over Lexi Thompson.

References
General

Specific

External links
Event media guide (PDF)
Kraft Nabisco Championship history (PDF)
LPGA Tour's tournament profile

Cham
Chevron Championship
Golf in California